The 1887 Basingstoke by-election was held on 18 July 1887 after the incumbent Conservative MP George Sclater-Booth became the first Baron Basing.  The seat was retained by the Conservative candidate Arthur Frederick Jeffreys.

References 

Basingstoke
By-elections to the Parliament of the United Kingdom in Hampshire constituencies
July 1887 events
1887 elections in the United Kingdom
1887 in England
19th century in Hampshire